There have been eight Baronetcies created for persons with the surname Jones, one in the Baronetage of England, one in the Baronetage of Great Britain and six in the Baronetage of the United Kingdom. Three of the creations are extant as of 2010.

The Jones Baronetcy, of Albemarlis in the County of Carmarthen, was created in the Baronetage of England on 25 July 1643 for Henry Jones. The title became extinct on his death in 1644.

The Jones Baronetcy, of Ramsbury in the County of Wiltshire, was created in the Baronetage of Great Britain on 27 May 1774 for William Jones. The title became extinct on his death in 1791.

The Jones, later Jones-Brydges Baronetcy, of Boultibrook in the County of Hereford, was created in the Baronetage of the United Kingdom on 9 October 1807. For more information on this creation, see Jones-Brydges baronets.

The Jones, later Lawrence-Jones Baronetcy, of Cranmer Hall in the County of Norfolk, was created in the Baronetage of the United Kingdom on 30 September 1831. For more information on this creation, see Lawrence-Jones baronets.

The Jones, later Prichard-Jones Baronetcy, of Bron Menai, Dwyran, in Llangeiwen in the County of Anglesey, was created in the Baronetage of the United Kingdom on 15 July 1910. For more information on this creation, see Prichard-Jones baronets.

The Jones Baronetcy, of Pentower in the County of Pembroke, was created in the Baronetage of the United Kingdom on 9 July 1917 for the Welsh civil engineer Evan Davies Jones. The title became extinct on the death of the second Baronet in 1952.

The Jones Baronetcy, of Treeton in the County of York, was created in the Baronetage of the United Kingdom on 23 May 1919 for the prominent Yorkshire industrialist Frederick Jones. His son, the second Baronet, was also a businessman. The family seat is Irnham Hall in Irnham, Lincolnshire.

The Jones, later Probyn-Jones Baronetcy, of Rhyll in the County of Flint, was created in the Baronetage of the United Kingdom on 28 January 1926. For more information on this creation, see Probyn-Jones baronets.

Jones baronets, of Albemarlis (1643)

Sir Henry Jones, 1st Baronet (died 1644)

Jones baronets, of Ramsbury (1774)
Sir William Jones, 1st Baronet (–1791)

Jones, later Jones-Brydges baronets, of Boultibrook (1807)
see Jones-Brydges baronets

Jones, later Lawrence-Jones baronets, of Cranmer Hall (1831)
see Lawrence-Jones baronets

Jones, later Prichard-Jones baronets, of Bron Menai (1910)
see Prichard-Jones baronets

Jones baronets, of Pentower (1917)
Sir Evan Davies Jones, 1st Baronet (1859–1949)
Sir Tom Barry Jones, 2nd Baronet (1888–1952)

Jones baronets, of Treeton (1919)
Sir Frederick John Jones, 1st Baronet (1854–1936)
Sir Walter Benton Jones, 2nd Baronet (1880–1967)
Sir Peter Fawcett Benton Jones, 3rd Baronet (1911–1972)
Sir Simon Warley Frederick Benton Jones, 4th Baronet (1941–2016) 
Sir James Peter Martin Benton Jones, 5th Baronet (born 1973)

Jones, later Probyn-Jones baronets, of Rhyll (1926)
see Probyn-Jones baronets

See also
Lawrence-Jones baronets
Jones-Brydges baronets
Jones-Parry baronets
Burne-Jones baronets
Tyrwhitt baronets of Stanley Hall, Shropshire

Notes

References
Kidd, Charles, Williamson, David (editors). Debrett's Peerage and Baronetage (1990 edition). New York: St Martin's Press, 1990, 

Baronetcies in the Baronetage of the United Kingdom
Extinct baronetcies in the Baronetage of England
Extinct baronetcies in the Baronetage of Great Britain
Extinct baronetcies in the Baronetage of the United Kingdom